A gong chime is a generic term for a set of small, high-pitched bossed pot gongs. The gongs are ordinarily placed in order of pitch, with the boss upward on cords held in a low wooden frame. The frames can be rectangular or circular (the latter are sometimes called "gong circles"), and may have one or two rows of gongs. They are played by one to four musicians, each using two padded sticks to strike them. They are an important instrument in many Southeast Asian musical ensembles, such as Indonesian gamelan, kulintang, or Thai pi phat. For this reason, such ensembles are sometimes called "gong chime ensembles" or "gong chime orchestras," and the broad variety of music "gong chime music."

Gong chimes typically are played either in a soloistic style, providing a virtuosic embellishing role, or providing a rhythmic role, for example, in a colotomic structure.

The term may also be used to refer to hand-held tuned gongs played in high rhythmic density, such as the older Indonesian-Balinese reyong, and gangsa, and also some ensembles of minorities within the mountainous interior of Vietnam.

List of gong chimes
Source: Sibyl Marcuse. Musical Instruments: A Comprehensive Dictionary. New York: Doubleday, 1964: 213.

 Babarangan (Bali, Indonesia) 
 Bonang (Java, Indonesia) 
 Cồng chiêng (Vietnam)
 Cang-chen (Tibet)
 Degung (West Java, Indonesia)
 Gong hui (Thailand)
 Jengglong (West Java, Indonesia)
 Kenong (Java, Indonesia)
 Khong mon (Mon of Burma and Thailand)
 Khong ñai (Laos)
 Khong noï (Laos)
 Khong wong lek (Thailand)
 Khong wong yai (Thailand)
 Kong von thom (Cambodia)
 Kong toch (Cambodia)
 Kong mon (Cambodia)
 Gangsa (Bali, Indonesia)
 Kulintang (Indonesia)
 Kromo (Dayak people of Borneo, Indonesia)
 Kye waing (Burma)
  (Burma)
 Mong (Shan State)
 Reyong (Bali, Indonesia)
 Talempong (Minangkabau of Sumatra, Indonesia)
 Tatabuan (Moluccas, Indonesia)
 Yunluo (China)

See also
 Gong
 Gamelan
 Music of Indonesia

References

Gongs
Gong and chime music